Kitanemuk was a Northern Uto-Aztecan language of the Serran branch. It was very closely related to Serrano, and may have been a dialect. It was spoken in the San Gabriel Mountains and foothill environs of Southern California. The last speakers lived some time in the 1940s, though the last fieldwork was carried out in 1937. J. P. Harrington took copious notes in 1916 and 1917, however, which has allowed for a fairly detailed knowledge of the language.

Morphology
Kitanemuk is an agglutinative language, where words use suffix complexes for a variety of purposes with several morphemes strung together.

Phonology

Consonants

The consonant phonemes of Kitanemuk, as reconstructed by Anderton (1988) based on Harrington's field notes, were (with some standard Americanist phonetic notation in :

Word-finally,  becomes , and all voiced consonants become voiceless before other voiceless consonants or word-finally.

Vowels

See also

Population of Native California
Native American history of California
Classification of Native Americans in California

References

Anderton, Alice J. (1988). The Language of the Kitanemuks of California. PhD. diss., University of California, Los Angeles.
Mithun, Marianne (1999). The Languages of Native North America. Cambridge: Cambridge University Press.

External links

Native Languages: Kitanemuk
 Kitanemuk language overview at the Survey of California and Other Indian Languages
Papers of John P. Harrington, Part 3, Southern California/Basin, OLAC Open Language Archive

Takic
Takic languages
Extinct languages of North America